The Journal of the Learning Sciences is a peer-reviewed academic journal covering research on education and learning as theoretical and design sciences. It is one of two official publications of the International Society of the Learning Sciences, and is published by Routledge. The current editors-in-chief are Susan Jurow (University of Colorado Boulder) and Jianwei Zhang (University at Albany, SUNY). Previous editors-in-chief include Susan A. Yoon, Jan van Aalst, Iris Tabak, Josh Radinsky, Cindy Hmelo-Silver, Yasmin Kafai, and founding editor emeritus Janet L. Kolodner.

Abstracting and indexing
According to the Journal Citation Reports, the journal has a 2020 impact factor of 5.171.

References

External links

Education journals
Routledge academic journals
5 times per year journals
Publications established in 1991
English-language journals